It Is Time for a Love Revolution is the eighth studio album by American rock musician Lenny Kravitz, released on February 5, 2008. The album produced four singles released in 2007 and 2008. This is Kravitz's final album for Virgin Records.

Background
It includes 14 original tracks, written, composed, arranged, performed, and produced by Kravitz. The album received Kravitz's best reviews in years, with Rolling Stone giving it three stars out of a possible five and suggesting that "As a blast back to the past, this is the best album Lenny Kravitz has ever made."

Kravitz toured with the album's material for two years after the release, starting with a performance of two new songs on Times Square New Year's Eve show, hosted by Carson Daly.

Release
It debuted at No. 4 on the Billboard 200, selling about 73,000 copies in its first week and becoming Kravitz's first US Top 5 album since 2000's Greatest Hits.

Reception
At Metacritic, which assigns a weighted mean rating out of 100 to reviews from mainstream critics, the album received an average score of 57, based on 17 reviews, which indicates "mixed or average reviews".

Michaelangelo Matos of The A.V. Club stated "Well, there go the rumors that with each album, Lenny Kravitz was going to jump ahead three years stylistically, catching up with the present some time around 2008. From its title on down, It Is Time For A Love Revolution is spiritually interchangeable with his debut, 1989's Let Love Rule". Stephen Thomas Erlewine of AllMusic wrote "...by the measure of pure sound, It Is Time for a Love Revolution is a glorious feast of retro-rock pleasures – a feast of empty calories perhaps, but sometimes fast food is more irresistible than a five-course meal". Betty Clarke of The Guardian wrote "having given up sex in a quest to find a wife, renowned lothario Lenny Kravitz has directed all his extra energy into getting back to his best. His eighth album is another collection of vintage riffs, funky rhythms and hippy-dippy sentiments but like an abstinence-propelled prize fighter, Kravitz sounds leaner and hungrier than for years... Ultimately bogged down by spirituality, guitar solos and soppy ballads, this comeback should nonetheless win Kravitz a few hearts, even if he doesn't discover a soulmate".

Leah Greenblatt of Entertainment Weekly commented "His infamous mane may be shorn but the songs on It Is Time for a Love Revolution remain the same: guitar-heavy, psychedelic-swirly, and determinedly flower-powered". Chad Grinshaw of IGN stated "It Is Time for a Love Revolution is a half-hearted return to Kravitz's bluesy-rock roots. There are glimpses of the rocker he used to be but too much of the album is nothing more than the same bland adult contemporary fodder he has been dishing out lately, dressed up with slightly cranked up guitar". A reviewer of Daily Express said "Energetic, youthful and without the cynical by-numbers feel of his recent albums, this feels like a fiery return to form". Terry Staunton of Record Collector wrote "Lenny's got a new album out, it's painfully similar to all his others and nowhere near as good as the records he listens to". David Fricke of Rolling Stone stated "As a blast back to the past, this is the best album Lenny Kravitz has ever made – a visceral, expertly tailored blend of late-Sixties and early-Seventies classic-rock paraphrases with just enough modernizing to justify the record's copyright date".

Track listing

Deluxe edition bonus DVD
 "It Is Time for a Love Revolution Intro" (Interview)
 "Let Love Rule" (5.1 Surround Video) (originally on Let Love Rule)
 "Mr. Cab Driver" (originally on Let Love Rule)
 "I'll Be Waiting" (Interview)
 "It Ain't Over 'Til It's Over" (originally on Mama Said)
 "Are You Gonna Go My Way" (originally on Are You Gonna Go My Way)
 "If You Want It" (Interview)
 "Rock and Roll Is Dead" (5.1 Surround Video) (originally on Circus)
 "A Long and Sad Goodbye" (Interview)
 "Fly Away" (originally on 5)
 "Lady" (originally on Baptism)
 "Love Revolution" (Interview)
 "Where Are We Runnin'?" (originally on Baptism)

Personnel
Musicians
 Lenny Kravitz – lead vocals, background vocals , electric guitar , electric guitar solo , bass , drums , piano , Mellotron , Wurlitzer electric piano , Moog , synthesizer , harpsichord , Hammond B-3 organ , harmonica , tambourine and handclaps , congas and cowbell , finger snaps , orchestral arrangement , string arrangement 
 Craig Ross – electric guitar , acoustic guitar , mandolin , handclaps , orchestral arrangement 
 Darrett Adkins – cello 
 Tawatha Agee – background vocals 
 Michael Block – cello 
 David Bowlin – violin 
 Tony Breit – bass 
 Kenji Bunch – viola 
 Robert Carlisle – French horn 
 Cornelius Dufallo – violin 
 Edison String Group – strings 
 Chris Gross – cello 
 Amy Kauffman – violin 
 Alexandra Knoll – oboe 
 Katie Kresek – violin 
 Conway Kuo – violin 
 Elizabeth Lim-Dutton – violin 
 Kurt Nikkanen – violin 
 Lenny Pickett – saxophone 
 Stewart Rose – French horn 
 Dov Scheindlin – viola 
 Anoushka Shankar – sitar 
 Antoine Silverman – violin 
 Liuh-Wen Ting – viola 

Production
 Lenny Kravitz – producer, mixing
 Henry Hirsch – engineer, mixing
 Cyrille Taillandier, Chris Theis, Tony Lowe, Cal Harris Jr. – assistant engineers
 Alex Alvarez – guitar and bass engineer 
 Ted Jensen – mastering

Commercial appearance
 The song "Love Revolution" was featured on the soundtrack of the 2008 comedy film Made of Honor.
 The song "Bring It On" was played on the 9th episode of the fifth season of the drama series One Tree Hill.
 The song "I'll Be Waiting" was featured on the 2008 Brazilian soap opera Beleza Pura.

Chart performance

Certifications and sales

Year-end charts

References

External links
 

2008 albums
2008 video albums
Lenny Kravitz albums
Virgin Records albums
Albums produced by Lenny Kravitz